"Digging..." is a popular Indian poem by the internationally acclaimed Indian English poet Gopi Krishnan Kottoor. The poem won Second Prize in the Seventh All India Poetry Competition conducted by The Poetry Society (India) in 1997. The renowned British poet Vicki Feaver was the Chairman of the award committee. This was the second major literary award for Kottoor, who went on to win four more major poetry awards at All India Poetry Competition.

Excerpts from the poem

The soil I now pick
contains fragments of the dead.
They once saddened and happied themselves here
turning to the sun and moon, quite puzzled
then taking things as they came,
for granted. This is hard brown laterite
that I turn,
to plant a few bright periwinkles
stolen from the mound of one long obscure,
dead. They should grow well here.

 *****

So I turn out
the millipedes curling up
ashamed of the sudden expose
into the dark ringstones of sapphire and topaz.
Pinned to sudden light they have all coiled up
in abject surrender. These things we bury back
with pushed up soil, crushing strange roots
going everywhere like soft nerve fibers,
sending messages of thirst to strange
destinations. Each scoop of mud
brings more life to light
lost like death underground
doing odd jobs, ordained like saints, salient
in dark recess drawing salary in kind.
Mud-work is a kind of worship.
A silent thanksgiving for a home, called earth.

Comments and criticism

The poem has received positive reviews since its first publication in 1997 in the book Emerging Voices. The poem has been frequently quoted in scholarly analysis of contemporary Indian English poetry. The poem has become very popular in Indian English literature and has been widely anthologised.

See also
The Poetry Society (India)

Notes

External links
  Eighth National Poetry Competition 1997 – Award Winners
Digging – The Full Poem
Gopi Kottoor and His Poems
K Srilata on Kottoor's Poetry
  India Writes – Contemporary Indian Poetry

Indian poems
1997 poems
Works originally published in Indian magazines
Works originally published in literary magazines